Hulbe Glacier is a glacier about  long draining the north side of Siple Island, Antarctica. It was named by the Advisory Committee on Antarctic Names after Christina Hulbe, faculty member of the University of Otago, New Zealand, and a theoretical and field researcher of ice motion in Antarctica.

References

Glaciers of Marie Byrd Land